Masumabad (also Romanized as Ma‘şūmābād; also known as Ma‘ẕūmābād, Kaleh Māsūmābād, and Qal‘eh Māsūmābād) is a village in Petergan Rural District, Central District, Zirkuh County, South Khorasan Province, Iran. At the 2006 census, its population was 201, in 50 families.

References 

Populated places in Zirkuh County